Ania Marson (born 22 May 1949 in Gdynia, Poland) is an Anglo-Polish actress.

Biography
She was trained at the famed Corona Stage Academy and began her career in 1963 in the famous series Dixon of Dock Green, then in 1960, in other series like The Troubleshooters in 1968 and Detective in 1969. In the 1970s, she appeared in Puppet on a Chain and Nicholas and Alexandra in 1971, where she played the Grand Duchess Olga Nikolaevna of Russia.  She subsequently appeared in Emma in 1972, The Abdication (1974), Blake's 7 (1978) and Bad Timing in 1980. In 2011 she appeared as Diana in Home Death (directed by Fiona Morrell) at the Finborough Theatre.

Family
Ania Marson is the wife of director Derek Lister. They were married on 3 September 1977 and have two daughters.

Filmography

Film

Television

External links

1949 births
Living people
English film actresses
English television actresses
English people of Polish descent